Deities of wine and beer include a number of agricultural deities associated with the fruits and grains used to produce alcoholic beverages, as well as the processes of fermentation and distillation.

 Abundantia, Roman goddess of abundance (see also: Habonde).
 Acan, Mayan God of alcohol.
 Acratopotes, one of Dionysus' companions and a drinker of unmixed wine.
 Aegir, a Norse divinity associated with ale, beer and mead.
 Aizen Myō-ō, Shinto god of tavern keepers.
 Amphictyonis/Amphictyonis, Greek goddess of wine and friendship.
 Bacchus, Roman god of wine, usually identified with the Greek Dionysus.
 Ba-Maguje, Hausa spirit of drunkenness.
 Bes, Egyptian god, protector of the home, and patron of beer brewers.
 Biersal/Bierasal/Bieresal, Germanic kobold of the beer cellar.
 Ceraon, who watched over the mixing of wine with water.
 Brigid of Kildare, patron saint of brewing.
 Dionysus, Greek god of wine, usually identified with the Roman Bacchus.
 Du Kang, Chinese Sage of wine.  Inventor of wine and patron to the alcohol industry.
 Inari, Shinto god(dess) of sake.
 Li Bai, Chinese god of wine and sage of poetry.
 Liber Pater, a Roman god of wine.
 Liu Ling, Chinese god of wine. One of the Seven Sages of the Bamboo Grove
 Mayahuel, Mexican goddess of pulque.
 Methe, Greek personification of drinking and drunkenness.
 Nephthys, Egyptian goddess of beer.
 Ninkasi, Sumerian goddess of beer.
 Nokhubulwane, Zulu goddess of the rainbow, agriculture, rain, and beer.
 Oenotropae, Greek goddesses, "the women who change (anything into) wine".
 Ogoun, Yoruba/West African/Voodoo god of rum.
 Ometochtli, Aztec gods of excess.
 Siduri, wise Mesopotamian female divinity of beer and wine in the Epic of Gilgamesh.
 Silenus, Greek god of wine, wine pressing, and drunkenness.
 Siris, Mesopotamian goddess of beer.
 Sucellus, Celtic god of agriculture, forests, and of the alcoholic drinks of the Gauls.
 Tao Yuanming, Chinese spirit of wine.
 Tenenet, Egyptian goddess of childbirth and beer.
 Varuni, Hindu goddess of wine.

See also
 Beer goddess
 Religion and alcohol

External links
 List of Goddesses

 
wine